Al-Khatib prison is a detention and torture center in the Muhajreen neighborhood of central Damascus, Syria. It is operated by Branch 251 of the Syrian General Intelligence Directorate.

Al-Khatib, like many prisons under the regime of Bashar al-Assad, is known from testimonies given by former detainees and survivors who recount the poor conditions and use of systematic and generalized torture that included rape and sexual violence. A significant number of deaths occurred due to this, some of which have been identified in the pictures taken by photographer César. During the Syrian civil war the prison held demonstrators, political prisoners, and human rights activists.

Anwar Raslan, a former Syrian colonel who was convicted of crimes against humanity in Germany, was in command of Branch 251 that managed the prison.

Justice 
At the beginning of 2019, two former employees of the Branch, sergeant  and colonel Anwar Raslan, were arrested in Germany. They were tried for atrocities committed within Branch 251 between 2011 and 2012.

In January 2021, Eyad al-Gharib was found guilty of complicity in crimes against humanity, for having transported demonstrators to the Branch.

The verdict at the sentencing of al-Gharib officially recognized that crimes against humanity had been committed at al-Khatib. The judges declared that at the prison of Branch 251 of the Syrian information service, brutal physical and psychological violence was used to force confessions, obtain information about the opposition movement, and to prevent prisoners from participating in further demonstrations against the government.

On 13 January 2022, Anwar Raslan, whose trial took place after the conviction of Al-Gharib, was found guilty of crimes against humanity by the High Court of Koblenz, as well as of the murder of 27 detainees between 2011 and 2012. He was sentenced to life in prison and is required to compensate the victims.

United States sanctions 
The Independent International Commission of Inquiry on Syria identified Branch 251 and Al-Khatib prison as a facility controlled by the Syrian General Intelligence Directorate where death in detention and torture have occurred.

References 

Prisons in Syria
Torture in Syria
Damascus
Protest tactics
21st-century criminals
Male criminals
Syrian colonels
Refugees in Germany
Prisoners and detainees of Germany
Living people
Prisoners sentenced to life imprisonment by Germany
Syrian emigrants to Germany
People convicted of torture
People of the Syrian civil war
Year of birth missing (living people)